Darlene de Souza Reguera (born 11 January 1990), simply known as Darlene, is a Brazilian professional footballer who plays for the Brazil national team. She participated at the 2015 FIFA Women's World Cup.

Club career
From 2012 to 2013, Darlene played club football in the Austrian ÖFB-Frauenliga, first for SV Neulengbach, then for Spratzern. She scored two goals in Spratzern's 2013 Austrian Cup final win over Neulengbach.

Darlene joined compatriots Raquel Fernandes and Rafaelle Souza in transferring to Chinese Women's Super League club Changchun Zhuoyue in January 2016.

In April 2018, Darlene left relegated Zaragoza CFF to sign for newly formed Benfica, who were entering the Portuguese second division.

International career
Darlene made her senior debut in December 2013, as a substitute in a 2–0 win over Chile at the 2013 Torneio Internacional de Brasília. In February 2015 Darlene was included in an 18-month residency programme intended to prepare Brazil's national team for the 2015 FIFA Women's World Cup in Canada and the 2016 Rio Olympics.

International goals

Honours
Benfica
 Campeonato Nacional Feminino: 2020–21
 Campeonato Nacional II Divisão Feminino: 2018–19
 Taça de Portugal: 2018–19
 Taça da Liga: 2019–20
 Supertaça de Portugal: 2019

References

External links

Darlene de Souza – 2015 Pan American Games profile

1990 births
Living people
People from São José do Rio Preto
Brazilian women's footballers
Brazil women's international footballers
Brazilian expatriate sportspeople in Spain
Expatriate women's footballers in Spain
2015 FIFA Women's World Cup players
Women's association football midfielders
Brazilian expatriate women's footballers
Brazilian expatriate sportspeople in Austria
Expatriate women's footballers in Austria
SV Neulengbach (women) players
Associação Desportiva Centro Olímpico players
Zaragoza CFF players
S.L. Benfica (women) footballers
Clube de Regatas do Flamengo (women) players
Expatriate women's footballers in Portugal
Campeonato Nacional de Futebol Feminino players
Changchun Zhuoyue players
Expatriate women's footballers in China
Brazilian expatriate sportspeople in China
Pan American Games medalists in football
Pan American Games gold medalists for Brazil
Footballers at the 2015 Pan American Games
ÖFB-Frauenliga players
Medalists at the 2015 Pan American Games
Footballers from São Paulo (state)